The German national ice sledge hockey team is the ice sledge hockey team representing Germany. The team is overseen by the Deutscher Rollstuhl-Sportverband (DRS), and participates in international competitions.

Tournament record

Performance in Paralympic Games
2006 – 4th

Performance in World Championship
2004 – 7th
2008 – 5th
2009 – 8th

Performance in European Championship
2005 –  Gold
2007 –  Bronze
2011 – 6th place

Rosters

2006 Paralympics roster
The following is the German roster in the men's ice sledge hockey tournament of the 2006 Winter Paralympics. 
 
Robert Lionel Pabst, Rolf Rabe, Sebastian Kessler, Sebstiaan Disveld, Sven Stumpe, Udo Segreff, Raimund Patzelt, Matthias Koch, Alexander Klein, Frank Rennhack, Gerd Bleidorn, Jorg Wedde, Marco Lahrs, Marius Hattendorf

2009 World Championship roster
Rolf Rabe, Lars Uhlemann, Matthias Koch, Marco Lars, Robert Pabst, Jörg Wedde, Christoph Appelkamp, Gerd Bleidorn, Sebastien Disveld, Torsten Ellmer, Marc Müller, Christian Pilz, Frank Rennhack, Udo Segreff, Sven Stumpe

See also
Germany men's national ice hockey team

References

External links
 Official site (German)
 Sledge-Eishockey at the Deutschen Rollstuhl-Sportverband (DRS) (German)

National ice sledge hockey teams
Ice Sledge Hockey